Guy Jacob Swope (December 26, 1892 – July 25, 1969) was an American teacher, accountant, and Democratic politician. His career included one term as a representative in the 77th United States Congress, serving as a director in the United States Department of Interior under Franklin D. Roosevelt, and serving for a brief period as acting governor of Puerto Rico in 1941. He also served in the United States Naval Reserve, Military Government Branch, where he attained the rank of Commander.

Swope was born in Meckville, Berks County, Pennsylvania and studied in Keystone State Teachers College and Columbia University School of International Affairs. After graduation, he first worked as a teacher in Lebanon County, Pennsylvania and later as an agent for the Internal Revenue Service. In 1935, he became the budgetary secretary for Pennsylvania and served in that position for two years before being elected to congress in 1936. He failed to win re-election in 1938.

He was made auditor of Puerto Rico in 1940 and served in that capacity for only a year before being appointed acting Governor. He only worked as governor for less than a year before becoming a Director in the Division of Territories and Island Possessions for the Department of the Interior.

During the Second World War, he joined the United States Naval Reserve. After the war, he was a civilian chief of the National Government Division in Tokyo, Japan and later as an assistant to the American High Commissioner in Germany.

After the war, Swope returned to political life with a failed bid for re-election to Congress in 1956, but he was appointed Deputy State Treasurer of Pennsylvania from 1961 until his retirement in 1965.

References

External links

1892 births
1969 deaths
Governors of Puerto Rico
School of International and Public Affairs, Columbia University alumni
Democratic Party members of the United States House of Representatives from Pennsylvania
20th-century American politicians